Saleem Iqbal  (1933 – 8 April 1996) was a Pakistani film music composers duo.

Early life
This was a pair of brothers – the older brother Iqbal Hussain (1931 – 8 April 1996) and the younger brother Saleem Hussain (1933 – 2 April 1996) who composed music in over 30 films in Pakistan. Both brothers were born in the residential neighbourhood of Bhati Gate, Lahore, British India.

Career
During the decade of the 1940s, both young teenagers then, used to stage the play Heer based on the epic love story of the 18th century Sufi poet Waris Shah in the narrow streets of the Walled City of Lahore. Brothers Saleem Hussain and Iqbal Hussain first got their training in the art of singing by their father Master Ilm Din who was also a local professional musician. Later, Saleem Hussain became associated with the film composer Feroz Nizami as his assistant, after the independence of Pakistan in 1947.

Film songs

References

External links

1931 births
1996 deaths
Pakistani film score composers
Pakistani musicians
Musicians from Lahore